The Electricity Generation Company (EÜAŞ) is the largest electric power company in Turkey. Owned by the government, it produces and trades electricity throughout the country.

History
EÜAŞ was founded by the government in 2001. Its main purpose was to plan and implement the energy policy of Turkey which, through the exploitation of the domestic products and resources, would distribute cheap electric power to all Turkish citizens. In 2018 it took over the state-owned electricity trading firm TETAŞ.

Power plants
 EUAŞ owns almost a fifth of Turkey's total generating capacity including coal, gas, hydro and wind power stations.

Lignite coalfields
 EUAŞ owns most of the country's lignite in 7 coalfields, including the largest Elbistan.

Pollution and deaths
EÜAŞ owns the old Can-1 and Afşin-Elbistan B power stations and buys from private sector lignite-fired plants: these power plants pollute and cause early deaths.

Electricity Trading
Çan-2 coal-fired power station opened in 2018 and EÜAŞ guaranteed 7 years of electricity purchases at a cost of between 64 and 70m USD per year.

Economics
EÜAŞ (with state-owned gas and oil company BOTAŞ) is an oligopoly and sets a soft cap on electricity spot prices; whereas prices to end consumers are regulated. In 2018 EÜAŞ lost 1.8 billion lira. Support for coal in Turkey resulting from annual expenditures of EÜAȘ in primary materials and supplies is estimated at ₺953 million (US$272 million) per year (2016–2017 average). It is on the Global Coal Exit List. According to Carbon Tracker in 2021 $300 m of the company's coal power investment on the Istanbul Stock Exchange was at risk of stranding.

Sources

References

External links

 "EÜAŞ" article Global Energy Monitor
 "TETAŞ" article Global Energy Monitor

Electric power companies of Turkey
Ministry of Energy and Natural Resources (Turkey)
Government-owned energy companies